Andrea Hansen  (née Hewitt, born 4 April 1982) is a New Zealand triathlete who placed third at the 2009 ITU Triathlon World Championships and competed at the 2008, 2012, and 2016 Summer Olympics.

Biography 
Hewitt was born in Christchurch, New Zealand, in 1982. She lived together with the French triathlete Laurent Vidal, who was also her coach and fiancé, in Sète on the Mediterranean from May to December, and for the rest of the year she returned to Christchurch until his death on 10 November 2015 from a heart attack. At the University of Canterbury in New Zealand she completed a Bachelor in Commerce and Economics. Andrea Hewitt's sisters are successful sportswomen as well. Tina, her elder sister, won the New Zealand Championship in Surf Life Saving, and Sara is part of the water polo National Team.

Athletic career
Hewitt's early athletic career was as a competitive pool swimmer and a surf life saver. She was a well known swimmer when at the beginning of 2005, at the age of 22, she decided to convert to triathlon and straight away won the bronze medal at the New Zealand U23 Championships and was admitted to the National Team. In autumn 2005, after having been into triathlon for not more than half a year, Hewitt won the U23 World Championships in Gamagori. In 2006, she took part in the first World Cup of her life, placing third in Mooloolaba (Elite category). In 2007, she won her first World Cup race in Kitzbühel and began taking part in the prestigious French Club Championship Series Lyonnaise des Eaux. In 2008, she placed 8th in the Olympic Games.

In 2009, Hewitt took part in seven out of eight competitions of the Dextro Energy World Championship Series and won three medals: gold in Madrid, silver in Yokohama and bronze in Kitzbühel, in the overall ranking she placed third.

At the beginning of the 2010 season Hewitt won the Oceania Championships and then achieved six top ten positions at the Elite Cup in Hy-Vee and at five of the six World Championship Series triathlons. In the World Championship Rankings 2010, Hewitt was number sixth. In France, Hewitt again represented Beauvais in the Lyonnaise des Eaux circuit and again played the decisive role. At Dunkirk and at Tourangeaux she won the gold medal, at the Grand Final of the Lyonnaise circuit in La Baule (Triathlon Audencia) she won silver. Hewitt did not take part at Beauvais and Paris, where Hollie Avil was the best triathlete of her club. Thus in 2010 again Beauvais owes its first place in the overall ranking of the French Club Championship to Andrea Hewitt and Hollie Avil, Anja Dittmer, and Vicky Holland. At La Baule there were no French triathletes among the three  of Beauvais at all.

From 2007 to 2010, Hewitt took part in 15 French Club Championship triathlons and won 7 gold medals, 3 silver medals, and 3 bronze medals, so she may be considered the dominant figure in French triathlon as well.

In 2011, Hewitt won the World Championship Series Grand Final in Beijing, China and placed second in the overall championship rankings.

At the 2012 Summer Olympics, Hewitt finished 6th. At the 2014 Commonwealth Games Hewitt finished in 4th place in the women's individual event, and was part of the New Zealand team that finished 5th in the mixed relay event. She represented—alongside Nicky Samuels—New Zealand at the 2016 Summer Olympics in triathlon and came seventh.

ITU results
In the seven years from 2005 to 2011, Hewitt took part in 58 individual ITU competitions and achieved 48 top ten positions, among which 21 medals. Unless indicated otherwise, the events are triathlons (Olympic Distance) and belong to the Elite category.

Honours
In the 2018 Queen's Birthday Honours, Hewitt was appointed a Member of the New Zealand Order of Merit, for services to triathlon.

Notes

External links

 ITU profile page
 

1982 births
Living people
New Zealand female triathletes
Commonwealth Games bronze medallists for New Zealand
Triathletes at the 2008 Summer Olympics
Triathletes at the 2012 Summer Olympics
Olympic triathletes of New Zealand
Triathletes at the 2006 Commonwealth Games
University of Canterbury alumni
New Zealand expatriates in France
Triathletes at the 2014 Commonwealth Games
Triathletes at the 2016 Summer Olympics
Commonwealth Games medallists in triathlon
Triathletes at the 2018 Commonwealth Games
Members of the New Zealand Order of Merit
People from Christchurch
20th-century New Zealand women
21st-century New Zealand women
Triathletes at the 2022 Commonwealth Games
Medallists at the 2006 Commonwealth Games
Medallists at the 2018 Commonwealth Games